Knut Haakonsson (Knut Håkonsson, Old Norse Knútr Hákonarson) (c. 1208–1261) was a Norwegian nobleman  and claimant to the throne during the Civil war era in Norway.

Biography
Haakonsson was born the son of jarl Haakon the Crazy (Håkon Galen) and Swedish noble-woman Kristina Nilsdotter. His father had been leader of the Norwegian army and steward of the kingdom during the short reign of  King Guttorm of Norway. His maternal grandfather was Eric the Saint who reigned as King Eric IX of Sweden. After the death of his father in 1214, Knut and his mother returned to Västergötland, Sweden where she married Swedish nobleman, Eskil Magnusson. In 1223 the archbishop of Nidaros stated in a council of the realm that it was known by all that Knut was the lawfully begotten heir of Earl Haakon the Crazy, perhaps implying that he would have inherited the title of earl possibly of Värmland which his grandfather had held.

In 1226, upon the death of Sigurd Ribbung, Knut was chosen as the new pretender of the Ribbung party. The Ribbunger forces were soon beaten militarily.  Knut resigned his pretender crown and made peace with King Haakon IV of Norway in 1227. He subsequently married Ingrid, a daughter of jarl Skule Baardsson, who had a form of power sharing with King Haakon.

Tensions between Skule Baardsson and King Haakon existed and in an effort to facilitate a compromise,  Skule was given the title Duke in 1237. However,  Skule rose to open revolt in 1239 and tried to win Knut over to his side. Knut rejected Skule's advances and remained loyal to King Haakon, who subsequently elevated him to jarl. Skule's rebellion met an unsuccessful end in 1240 and the duke was killed. After Skule's death, no one was able to challenge King Haakon's position in Norway.

For the rest of his life, Knut retained the title of jarl, which formally made him the highest ranking man in the country after the king and his sons. Whether he held much real power over affairs of state is doubtful. In September 1261, he carried the crown at the coronation ceremony of Haakon's son, King Magnus VI of Norway. Later that same year, Knut died and was buried in Bergen Cathedral.

Historic Prospective
The Norwegian Civil war era  (Norwegian: Borgerkrigstida) was the period between 1130 and 1240. During this time, a series of civil wars were fought between rival kings and pretenders to the throne of Norway. The reasons for the wars is one of the most debated topics in Norwegian medieval history. The goal of the warring parties was always to put their man on the throne, starting with the death of King Sigurd the Crusader in 1130. In the first decades of the civil wars, alliances were shifting, and centered on the person of a king or pretender, but eventually, towards the end of the 12th century, two rival parties emerged, known as the Birkebeiner  and the Bagler. After these two parties were reconciled in 1217, a more ordered system of government centered on the king was gradually able to bring an end to the frequent risings. The failed rising of duke Skule Bårdsson in 1240 was the final event of the civil war era.

References

Other sources
Vigfusson, Gudbrand  (editor) Sturlunga Saga (Oxford: Clarendon Press. 1878)
Koht, Halvdan  The Scandinavian Kingdoms until the end of the thirteenth century (Cambridge University Press. 1929)
Hartvedt, Gunnar Hagen Bergen Byleksikon (Bergen, Norway: 1994)

1208 births
1261 deaths
Norwegian earls
Norwegian civil wars
Pretenders to the Norwegian throne
13th-century Norwegian nobility
Norwegian people of Swedish descent